Sefer Nizzahon Yashan (ספר ניצחון) "The (old) Book of Victory" is an anonymous 13th-century Jewish apologetic text that originated in Germany. The word "old" (Hebrew yashan, Latin vetus) has become attached to the title to distinguish the work from the Sefer Nizzahon of Yom-Tov Lipmann-Muhlhausen of Prague, written in the 15th century. A modern edition was published by Mordechai Breuer in 1978, and a critical edition by David Berger in 2008.

The work was known and responded to by Protestant Hebraists and polemicists including Johann Reuchlin, Sebastian Münster, Wolfgang Capito, Immanuel Tremellius, John Calvin, and Martin Luther.

See also
 Judaism's view of Jesus
 Dialogue with Trypho

References

Jewish apologetics
Jewish–Christian debate
Works published anonymously
13th-century literature
13th-century Judaism